Ford Motor Company of New Zealand Limited is the New Zealand subsidiary of Ford Motor Company. The Ford-New Zealand assembly and distribution  began in 1936, following the successful representation of Ford's New Zealand business by The Colonial Motor Company (CMC).  Ford-New Zealand was based in Seaview, Wellington.  A second assembly plant was opened in Wiri, Auckland in 1973.  The head office was moved to Auckland before Seaview was closed in 1988 and, in 1997, vehicle production at Wiri came to an end.  Since then, all of the Ford-New Zealand product offerings have been fully imported.

History
The Ford Motor Company of Canada had been established in 1904, to build and to sell the Ford products to the territories that made up the British Empire, including New Zealand.  This was a way to avoid the tariffs that existed upon American-made products imported into Empire states.  In turn, Ford of Canada established privately-owned agencies in those various Empire states to handle the business.
In the early 1920s, because the Ford business around the world had now become so large, the Ford directors concluded that leaving the assembly and distribution of their products to other than Ford-owned interests posed a quality-control risk.  Ford of Canada acted first in South Africa, where their appointed agent had not been following Ford guidelines, and an assembly plant and head office was set up in Port Elizabeth.  Then they looked to Australia, where it was decided the agency operation was not in Ford's best interests, and an assembly and a manufacturing operation was set up in Geelong, Victoria and opened in 1925.  But, so satisfied with the CMC performance in their New Zealand territory that it was not until 1936 that Ford of Canada set up in New Zealand.  It was the last of their oversea territories to be taken over, and Ford's relationship with CMC continued as that organisation retained and further developed retail Ford outlets.  The Ford and CMC relationship has survived to this day, and it makes CMC-owned Ford dealerships amongst the oldest in the world.

Choosing Wellington as the location for the huge new assembly plant made sense.  Wellington is the capital, the centre of government and the base for most national and international corporations.  The prerequisite port was well developed and good rail and road connections gave good access to and from all parts of the country.  A new industrial area was being established in the Hutt Valley and there was abundant space there for expansion.  Low-cost housing was being built in the new suburbs nearby, to house the workforce. 

The building Ford erected was of exceptional significance in New Zealand.  The "daylight factory" design had evolved over the past 20 years, and it made extensive use of glass for natural light and ventilation.  No longer were Ford's plants high rise - they were built on one level, so as to make use of Ford's highly-efficient moving assembly line methods of assembly.  The neo-classical façade facing Seaview Road also typical of Ford's worldwide image - this highly-attractive frontage and well-tended gardens hid the functional role of the building.  There was no mistaking who occupied the impressive new building - the largest neon sign in the southern hemisphere was mounted on the roof, facing Seaview Road and out over the harbour towards Wellington city, from where it was visible! <Ford in New Zealand - Driving Ahead 1936 to 1997, John Stokes, New Holland Publishing ISBN 9781869665357>

Production began in October, 1936 before the building was completed.  The first cars built were the current 1936 Model 68 V8, which arrived CBD (completely broken-down) in wooden crates shipped from Ford of Canada.  These were joined soon after by the British-sourced 10-HP Model C and the 8-HP Model Y.  Whilst next years models were released in America in September each year, there was always a lag before they arrived on roads overseas.  For instance, it was not until July, 1937 that the 1937 Model 78 V8 was released in New Zealand.  In September, 1937 the British Model C was replaced by the Ford Ten 7W, a revised version of which was known as the E93A, released in New Zealand in March, 1939.  This was the first car that Ford gave a name to - it was the Prefect.  Similarly, when it was released in Britain in January, 1940 after the outbreak of World War Two, the revised Ford Eight had given the very patriotic name of Anglia - the first Anglias were sold in New Zealand in July, 1940.
    
On the outbreak of war production shifted solely to military work and, during World War II, Ford New Zealand produced 10,423 vehicles including Bren Gun Carriers as well as 5.7 million hand grenades and 1.2 million mortar rounds. Civilian car production resumed in 1946 which was also the year assembly of the Fordson tractor was introduced in New Zealand. In 1965 a parts depot opened in Auckland leading the transfer of operations from Wellington to Auckland and in 1972 a transmission and chassis manufacturing facility at Wiri, Manukau City. The Auckland assembly plant was also completed in 1972 and began building Falcons the next year. In 1981 an alloy wheel plant was opened at Wiri. By 1987 most operations had been moved from Seaview to Wiri, Auckland and the Seaview plant was closed in 1988 after 52 years. Ford New Zealand underwent a major restructuring in 1987–88, including relocation of all operations to Wiri.

Products made by Ford New Zealand up from the early 1950s until the 1980s (with exception of the Falcon/Fairmont range, and low volume American product until the 1960s) were predominantly British. Generations of New Zealanders grew up with Anglias, Escorts, Cortinas, Zephyrs and Zodiacs just as New Zealand's immediately preceding generation grew up with Canadian sourced (for Imperial Preference tariffs) but locally assembled Model Ts, Model As and Ford V8s. All were successful. Falcons from Australia were very popular running a close second to Holden right through from the 1960s to the 1980s.

In common with other countries in the Asia Pacific region, Ford New Zealand marketed the Mazda-based Laser and Telstar, which replaced the British Escort and Cortina in the early 1980s. Unlike Australia, however, the Sierra was assembled and sold locally in New Zealand in the mid-1980s and early 1990s, though generally only available as a wagon.

A wagon version of the Telstar was eventually offered in New Zealand, based on Mazda's GV platform – in fact New Zealand was the only country outside Japan where this body style was available. It continued to be marketed locally, along with a sedan version called the Telstar Orion, until 1997.

This sharing of models between Ford and Mazda led to the creation of a joint venture called Vehicle Assemblers of New Zealand (VANZ), in which Ford New Zealand held a 74 percent equity. This had followed the closure of Mazda's own assembly plant in Otahuhu in 1987. The Mazda 323 and 626, were assembled alongside the almost identical Ford Laser and Telstar until well into the 1990s. This was in contrast to Australia, where Mazdas were not assembled locally. Ford Australia switched to importing those models from Japan with the closure of its plant in Homebush West, Sydney.

However, free-market reforms in New Zealand in the late 1980s saw the lowering of import tariffs and a flood of used imports from Japan. Many of these were mechanically identical Mazda Capellas (as the 626 was known in Japan), as well as Ford Telstars and Mondeos. In addition, Australian-built Fords like the Falcon, and its GM rival, the Holden Commodore, could now be imported New Zealand duty-free.

With the demise of local car assembly looking inevitable, VANZ announced it would cease operations in 1997. The alloy wheel plant was sold in 2001. Ford Australia ended manufacture in October 2016.

Ford New Zealand has added Ford Mustang to its range

Models

Current Passenger cars November 2019
Ford Fiesta
Ford Focus 
Ford Kuga
Ford Mondeo
Ford Mustang

Former Passenger cars 
Model T Canada
Model A Canada
Ford V8 Canada until 1954
Ford Model Y United Kingdom
Ford Eight United Kingdom
Ford Anglia United Kingdom
Ford Prefect United KingdomFord Festiva 
Ford Territory (Australia)
Ford Customline (Canada)
Ford Mustang (USA)Ford Popular United Kingdom
Ford V8 United Kingdom
Ford Zephyr United Kingdom
Ford Consul United Kingdom
Ford Falcon (Australia)
Ford Cortina United Kingdom
Ford Escort United Kingdom
Ford Sierra United Kingdom

Current Commercial vehicles  November 2019
Ford Ranger
Ford Transit Custom
Ford Transit Cargo
Ford Tourneo Custom
Ford N-series

Former Commercial vehicles
Fordson Trucks United Kingdom
Fordson Vans and Light Trucks United Kingdom
Thames Trader United Kingdom
Ford Falcon (Australia)
Ford D-series

See also 
 Automotive industry in New Zealand
Automotive industry in Australia

References

10. Ford in New Zealand Vol 2 - Driving Ahead 1936 to 1997, John Stokes, New Holland Publishing 2020, ISBN 9781869665357

External links
 
 Ford Seaview 20 October 1960
 Historic Places Trust
 Telstar Performance
 Ford Motor Company of New Zealand Ltd, National Library of New Zealand

Motor vehicle manufacturers of New Zealand
Motor vehicle assembly plants in New Zealand
New Zealand companies established in 1936
Vehicle manufacturing companies established in 1936
Ford Motor Company
New Zealand subsidiaries of foreign companies